Events in the year 2000 in Turkey.

Incumbents
President: Süleyman Demirel (until 16 May), Ahmet Necdet Sezer (starting 16 May)
Prime Minister: Bülent Ecevit

Establishments
1 February - The Abdi İpekçi Peace Monument is inaugurated.

Deaths
15 April – Hayati Hamzaoğlu
25 October – Nejat Saydam

References

 
Years of the 20th century in Turkey
Turkey
Turkey
Turkey